Frederic Stanley "Rick" Mishkin (born January 11, 1951) is an American economist and Alfred Lerner professor of Banking and Financial Institutions  at the Graduate School of Business, Columbia University. He was a member of the Federal Reserve Board of Governors from 2006 to 2008.

Early life and education
Mishkin was born in New York City to Sidney Mishkin (1913–1991) and Jeanne Silverstein. His late father endowed the Mishkin Gallery at Baruch College of the City University of New York. He attended Fieldston School, then received a B.S. (1973) and Ph.D. (1976), both in economics, from the Massachusetts Institute of Technology. His doctoral advisor was Stanley Fischer. In 1999, he received an honorary professorship from the People's (Renmin) University of China.

Career
Mishkin has been a full professor at Columbia Business School since 1983. He held the A. Barton Hepburn Professorship of Economics from 1991 to 1999, when he was appointed Alfred Lerner Professor of Banking and Financial Institutions. He was also a research associate at the National Bureau of Economic Research (1980 to 2006) and a senior fellow at the Federal Deposit Insurance Corporation's Center for Banking Research (2003 to 2006). Dr. Mishkin was also a professor at the University of Chicago (1976–1983), a visiting professor at Northwestern University (1982-1983), and visiting professor at Princeton University (1990–1991).

From 1994 to 1997, Mishkin was Executive Vice President and Director of Research at the Federal Reserve Bank of New York and an Associate Economist of the Federal Open Market Committee of the Federal Reserve System. Dr. Mishkin was the editor of the Federal Reserve Bank of New York's Economic Policy Review and later served on that journal's editorial board. From 1997 to 2006, he also was an academic consultant to and served on the Economic Advisory Panel of the Federal Reserve Bank of New York.  Mishkin has been an academic consultant to the Board of Governors and a visiting scholar at the Board's Division of International Finance.

Mishkin has been a consultant to the World Bank, the Inter-American Development Bank, and the International Monetary Fund, as well as to numerous central banks throughout the world. He was also a member of the International Advisory Board to the Financial Supervisory Service of South Korea and an adviser to the Institute for Monetary and Economic Research at the Bank of Korea.

In 2006 Mishkin co-authored a report called Financial Stability in Iceland. The report maintained that Iceland's economic fundamentals were strong. The report was commissioned by the Icelandic Chamber of Commerce in response to critical coverage of the Icelandic economy and certain Icelandic companies in the international business media. Mishkin was paid $124,000 to co-author the report.

Two and a half years later, Iceland experienced a spectacular financial collapse. According to the documentary film Inside Job, the title of the report was changed to Financial Instability in Iceland on Mishkin's curriculum vitae (CV). Mishkin's CV was later corrected to list the report with its original title. Mishkin wrote a note published on October 6, 2010, at the Financial Times' blog explaining his participation in the documentary Inside Job. The director of Inside Job, Charles Ferguson, responded to Mishkin's note at the same blog.

Mishkin was confirmed as a member of the Board of Governors of the Federal Reserve on September 5, 2006, to fill an unexpired term ending January 31, 2014.  On May 28, 2008, in the middle of the financial collapse, he submitted his resignation from the Board of Governors, effective August 31, 2008, in order to revise his textbook and resume his teaching duties at Columbia Business School.

Authorships and publications
Mishkin's research focuses on monetary policy and its impact on financial markets and the aggregate economy. He is the author of more than fifteen books and has published numerous articles in professional journals and books.  Mishkin has served on the editorial board of the American Economic Review and has been an associate editor at the Journal of Business and Economic Statistics, the Journal of Applied Econometrics, and the Journal of Economic Perspectives. He was an associate editor (member of the editorial board) at the Journal of Money, Credit and Banking, Macroeconomics and Monetary Economics Abstracts, Journal of International Money and Finance, International Finance, and Finance India.

Mishkin is the author of the textbook Economics of Money, Banking, and Financial Markets (What's New in Economics) (12th edition)

Personal life
He is married to Sally Hammond, a landscape designer. They have a son and a daughter.

References

External links
Columbia Business School biographical article
Federal Reserve Board public domain biography
Resignation letter
Resignation press release
The economist’s reply to the “Inside Job”
Statements and Speeches of Frederic S. Mishkin

1951 births
20th-century American Jews
American male non-fiction writers
American textbook writers
Columbia Business School faculty
Ethical Culture Fieldston School alumni
Federal Reserve System governors
Financial economists
Living people
MIT School of Humanities, Arts, and Social Sciences alumni
Northwestern University faculty
Princeton University faculty
University of Chicago faculty
George W. Bush administration personnel
21st-century American Jews